is a Japanese manga author who has created mostly dōjinshi, but is also the illustrator of the third Little Busters! manga adaptation which began serialization in Kadokawa Shoten's manga magazine Comp Ace on March 26, 2008.

References

External links
Mogura Anagura's personal website 

Living people
Manga artists
Year of birth missing (living people)